The Polysyllabic Spree is a 2004 collection of Nick Hornby's "Stuff I've Been Reading" columns in The Believer. The book collates his columns from September 2003 to November 2004, inclusive. It also includes excerpts from such authors as Anton Chekhov and Charles Dickens.

In it, Hornby lists the books he bought each month, and the books he actually read. For instance, he might buy Dickens, but read J.D. Salinger. He then writes a column revolving around what he read, bought, and what he intends/intended to read.

The title is a reference to the choral symphonic-rock group The Polyphonic Spree. In the book, Hornby describes the people who run The Believer as being "all dressed in white robes and smiling maniacally, sort of like a literary equivalent of the Polyphonic Spree." (pg. 30)

There are three follow-up books, Housekeeping vs. The Dirt (2006),  Shakespeare Wrote for Money (2008) and More Baths Less Talking (2012).

List of books

September 2003 
Books bought:

 Robert Lowell: A Biography – Ian Hamilton
 Collected Poems – Robert Lowell
 Against Oblivion: Some of the Lives of the 20th-Century Poets – Ian Hamilton
 In Search of J. D. Salinger – Ian Hamilton
 Nine Stories – J. D. Salinger
 Franny and Zooey – J. D. Salinger
 Raise High the Roof Beam, Carpenters and Seymour: An Introduction – J. D. Salinger
 The Ern Malley Affair – Michael Heyward
 Something Happened – Joseph Heller
 Penguin Modern Poets 5 – Corso/Ferlinghetti/Ginsberg

Books read:

 All the Salingers
 In Search of Salinger and Lowell
 Some of Against Oblivion
 Pompeii by Robert Harris (not bought)

October 2003 

Books bought:

 A Tragic Honesty: The Life and Work of Richard Yates – Blake Bailey
 Notes on a Scandal – Zoë Heller (released in the US as "What Was She Thinking? Notes on a Scandal")

Books read:

 Being John McEnroe – Tim Adams
 Stop-Time – Frank Conroy
 The Fortress of Solitude – Jonathan Lethem
 Desperate Characters – Paula Fox
 Notes on a Scandal – Zoë Heller
 Where You’re At – Patrick Neate
 Feel Like Going Home – Peter Guralnick
 The People's Music – Ian MacDonald
 A Tragic Honesty – Blake Bailey (unfinished)
 How to Stop Smoking and Stay Stopped for Good – Gillian Riley
 Quitting Smoking – The Lazy Person's Guide! – Gillian Riley

November 2003 

Books bought:

 Bush at War – Bob Woodward
 Six Days of War – Michael B. Oren
 Genome – Matt Ridley
 Isaac Newton – James Gleick
 God’s Pocket – Pete Dexter
 The Poet and the Murderer – Simon Worrall
 Sputnik Sweetheart – Haruki Murakami
 Lie Down in Darkness – William Styron
 Leadville – Edward Platt
 Master Georgie – Beryl Bainbridge
 How to Breathe Underwater – Julie Orringer (two copies)

Books read:

 A Tragic Honesty: The Life and Work of Richard Yates – Blake Bailey (completed)
 Wenger: The Making of a Legend – Jasper Rees
 How to Breathe Underwater – Julie Orringer
 Bush at War – Bob Woodward (unfinished)
 Unnamed Literary Novel (abandoned)
 Unnamed Work of Nonfiction (abandoned)
 No Name – Wilkie Collins (unfinished)

December 2003/January 2004 

Books bought:

 Moneyball – Michael Lewis
 Saul and Patsy – Charles Baxter
 Winner of the National Book Award – Jincy Willett
 Jenny and the Jaws of Life – Jincy Willett
 The Sirens of Titan – Kurt Vonnegut
 True Notebooks – Mark Salzman

Books read:

 No Name – Wilkie Collins
 Moneyball – Michael Lewis
 George and Sam: Autism in the Family – Charlotte Moore
 The Sirens of Titan – Kurt Vonnegut

February 2004 

Books bought:

 Old School – Tobias Wolff
 Train – Pete Dexter
 Backroom Boys – Francis Spufford
 You Are Not a Stranger Here – Adam Haslett
 Eats, Shoots and Leaves – Lynn Truss

Books read:

 Enemies of Promise – Cyril Connolly
 What Just Happened? – Art Linson
 Clockers – Richard Price
 Eats, Shoots and Leaves – Lynn Truss
 Meat Is Murder – Joe Pernice
 Dusty in Memphis – Warren Zanes
 Old School – Tobias Wolff
 Introducing Time – Craig Callender and Ralph Edney
 PLUS: a couple of stories in You Are Not a Stranger Here; a couple of stories in Sixty Stories by Donald Barthelme; a couple of stories in Here's Your Hat What's Your Hurry by Elizabeth McCracken.

March 2004 

Books bought:
 The Amateur Marriage – Anne Tyler
 The Eclipse – Antonella Gambotto
 The Complete Richard Hannay –  John Buchan
 Selected Letters – Gustave Flaubert
 Vietnam-Perkasie – W. D. Ehrhart

Books read:
 Some of Flaubert's letters
 Not Even Wrong – Paul Collins
 How Mumbo-Jumbo Conquered the World – Francis Wheen
 Liar's Poker – Michael Lewis
 Some of Greenmantle – John Buchan
 How to Give Up Smoking and Stay Stopped for Good – Gillian Riley

April 2004 

Books bought:
 Hangover Square – Patrick Hamilton
 The Long Firm – Jake Arnott
 American Sucker – David Denby

Books read:
 Hangover Square – Patrick Hamilton
 The Long Firm – Jake Arnott
 The Curious Incident of the Dog in the Night-Time – Mark Haddon
 True Notebooks – Mark Salzman

May 2004 

Books bought:
 Random Family: Love, Drugs, Trouble, and Coming of Age in the Bronx – Adrian Nicole LeBlanc
 What Narcissism Means to Me – Tony Hoagland
 David Copperfield – Charles Dickens (twice)

Books read:
 David Copperfield – Charles Dickens

June 2004 

Books bought:
 Donkey Gospel – Tony Hoagland
 I Never Liked You – Chester Brown
 We Need to Talk About Kevin – Lionel Shriver

Books read:
 Random Family – Adrian Nicole LeBlanc
 What Narcissism Means to Me – Tony Hoagland
 Bobby Fischer Goes to War – David Edmonds and John Eidinow

July 2004 

Books bought[¹]:
 The Invisible Woman – Claire Tomalin
 Y: The Last Man Vols 1–3 – Vaughan, Guerra, Marzan Jr., Chadwick
 I Never Liked You – Chester Brown
 David Boring – Daniel Clowes
 The Amazing Adventures of The Escapist – Michael Chabon et al.
 Safe Area Goražde – Joe Sacco
 Not Entitled – Frank Kermode

[¹] The author here inserts a footnote: "I bought so many books this month it’s obscene, and I’m not owning up to them all: this is a selection. And to be honest, I’ve been economical with the truth for months now. I keep finding books that I bought, didn’t read, and didn’t list."

Books read:
 Train – Pete Dexter
 This Is Serbia Calling – Matthew Collin
 The Invisible Woman – Claire Tomalin
 Y: The Last Man Vols 1–3 – Vaughan, Guerra, Marzan Jr., Chadwick
 I Never Liked You – Chester Brown
 David Boring – Daniel Clowes

August 2004 
Books bought:
 Prayers for Rain – Dennis Lehane
 Mystic River – Dennis Lehane
 Jesse James: Last Rebel of the Civil War – T. J. Stiles
 The Line of Beauty – Alan Hollinghurst
 Like a Fiery Elephant – Jonathan Coe

Books read:
 Prayers for Rain – Dennis Lehane
 Mystic River – Dennis Lehane
 Like a Fiery Elephant – Jonathan Coe

References

External links 
 "Stuff I've Been Reading" – selections from Hornby's columns on The Believer website.

2004 non-fiction books
McSweeney's books
Books of literary criticism
Works by Nick Hornby